Amilcar Adrián Balercia (born 24 June 1967) is an Argentine former footballer who played for clubs in Argentina and Chile.

References

1967 births
Living people
Sportspeople from Buenos Aires Province
Argentine footballers
Association football midfielders
Club Atlético Huracán footballers
Audax Italiano footballers
Rangers de Talca footballers
Deportes Melipilla footballers
Deportes Colchagua footballers
Primera B de Chile players
Chilean Primera División players
Argentine Primera División players
Expatriate footballers in Chile
Argentine expatriate footballers